António Luís Cavaco Silva Sá Montez (born 29 September 2001), known as just António Montez, is a Portuguese professional footballer who plays as a centre-back for Belenenses SAD.

Club career
Montez is a youth product of CIF and Belenenses SAD. He was called to the senior team after a COVID-19 outbreak hit the squad. One of only 9 starters in the squad for the match, he made his professional debut with B-SAD in a 7–0 Primeira Liga loss to Benfica on 24 July 2021 that ended up being called off.

Personal life
Montez is the grandson of the former Prime Minister of Portugal Aníbal Cavaco Silva.

References

External links

2001 births
Living people
Portuguese footballers
Association football defenders
Belenenses SAD players
Primeira Liga players
Campeonato de Portugal (league) players